Randy Henderson is an American fantasy, urban fantasy writer.

Profile 
Randy Henderson is a writer of the Future Golden Pen Award winner, and first place quarterly winner in 2014. He's an alumnus of Clarion West Writers Workshop, a member of SFWA and Codex, and has published short stories in Penumbra, Escape Pod, and Realms of Fantasy.

His urban fantasy series from TOR (US) and Titan (UK) includes Finn Fancy Necromancy, and Bigfootloose and Finn Fancy Free, and has been described as "dark and quirky".

Bibliography

Novels 
 Finn Fancy Necromancy (Tor) 2014
 Bigfootloose and Finn Fancy Free (Tor) 2015
 Smells Like Finn Spirit (Tor) 2017

Short stories, novellas and novelettes; short story collections 
 
 A Witch’s Heart (short story, originally published in Realms of Fantasy) 2011
 Surviving the eBookalypse (short story, originally published in Escape Pod) 2012

Award nominations 

 2014 Memories Bleed Beneath the Mask" (short story)  Writers of the Future 1st quarter: 2014 Hubbard

References

External links 
  website
 Brief profile at Writers of the Future website

Living people
21st-century American novelists
American fantasy writers
American male short story writers
American male novelists
Novelists from Washington (state)
21st-century American short story writers
21st-century American male writers
Year of birth missing (living people)